Ayron Verkindere (born 17 May 1997) is a Belgian footballer who plays in the midfield for KFC Izegem.

He comes from Cercle's youth team.

Club career
Verkindere made his debut on 12 April 2014 in the Jupiler Pro League. He substituted Tim Smolders at half-time in a 2–4 home defeat against Sporting Charleroi.

References

External links

1997 births
Living people
Belgian footballers
Cercle Brugge K.S.V. players
Belgian Pro League players
Challenger Pro League players
Flemish sportspeople
Belgium youth international footballers
Association football midfielders
Royal FC Mandel United players